Notable people with the name Papi include:

Surname 
 Hanina b. Papi (fl. 3rd or 4th century), Jewish Amora sage
 Rav Papi (fl. 4th century), Jewish Amora sage
 Abdolmohammad Papi (born 1987), Iranian Greco-Roman wrestler
 Claude Papi (1949–1983), French footballer
 Gennaro Papi (1886–1941), Italian opera conductor
 Hossein Papi (born 1985), Iranian footballer
 Mike Papi (born 1992), American minor league baseball player
 Samuele Papi (born 1973), Italian volleyball player
 Stan Papi (born 1951), American former Major League Baseball player
 Giulio Papi (born 1965), Italian -Switzerland famous mechanical watch engineer

Given name 
 Papi Khomane (born 1975), South African former footballer
 Papi Kimoto (born 1976), Congolese retired footballer
 Papi Turgeman (born 1970), Israeli basketball player
 Papi Zothwane (born 1981), South African footballer

Nickname 
 Edgar Martinez, (born 1963) Major League Baseball player
 Auston Matthews (born 1997), American ice hockey player
 David Ortiz, (born 1975) Major League Baseball player, nickname "Big Papi"
 Papi Oviedo (born 1937), Cuban musician
 Papi Sanchez (born 1975), Dominican merengue singer and rapper
 Jiang Yilei (born 1987), Chinese comedian, online moniker "Papi Jiang"

See also
 Max Papis, Italian racing driver